The 2012 Campeonato da 1ª Divisão do Futebol season is the 29th season of football in Macau and started on January 6 and ended June 10, 2012. Ka I were the defending champion and retained their title.

Standings

Results
Each team plays each other team twice.

References 
soccerway.com

Campeonato da 1ª Divisão do Futebol seasons
Macau
Macau
1